TLZ may stand for:
 Thüringische Landeszeitung, a German newspaper 
 Trierische Landeszeitung, a German newspaper
 The file extension for tar files compressed with LZMA or lzip.